Guillermo Alejandro Moscoso (born November 14, 1983) is a Venezuelan professional baseball pitcher for the Bravos de León of the Mexican League. He has played in Major League Baseball (MLB) for the Texas Rangers, Oakland Athletics, Colorado Rockies and San Francisco Giants.

Career

Detroit Tigers organization
As a member of the Oneonta Tigers, Moscoso pitched the second perfect game in New York–Penn League history in a 6–0 victory over the Batavia Muckdogs on July 15, 2007.

Texas Rangers
Moscoso was acquired by the Texas Rangers from the Detroit Tigers along with pitcher Carlos Melo for catcher Gerald Laird on December 12, 2008.

On May 30, Moscoso made his major league debut against the Oakland Athletics, striking out 2 and pitching a scoreless ninth inning.

After appearing in ten games in '09, Moscoso had an ERA of 3.21 through 14.0 innings pitched, giving up 15 hits, 7 runs, and 6 walks but also struck out a dozen. As of August, Moscoso has only pitched one game in the new decade. On May 20, against Baltimore, Guillermo pitched  of an inning, giving up two hits, two runs, and two walks while also striking out two. His ERA is currently 27.00.

Oakland Athletics
In January 2011, Texas traded Moscoso to the Oakland for Ryan Kelly.

On May 24, 2011, he was recalled to the Oakland Athletics to take the place in the rotation of Tyson Ross, who went on the DL with a strained left oblique. Fautino de los Santos was optioned to Triple-A to make room.

On September 7, 2011, he carried a no hitter against the Kansas City Royals into the eighth inning.

Colorado Rockies
On January 16, 2012, Moscoso was traded, along with fellow pitcher Josh Outman, to the Colorado Rockies for outfielder Seth Smith. Moscoso went 3-2 with a 6.12 ERA with 50 innings in 23 appearances, 3 starts.

Kansas City Royals
The Kansas City Royals claimed Moscoso off waivers on November 2, 2012. The Royals released him on March 13, 2013.

Toronto Blue Jays
The Toronto Blue Jays announced that they had claimed Moscoso on waivers on March 16, 2013.

Chicago Cubs
On March 27, 2013, Moscoso was claimed on waivers by the Chicago Cubs.

San Francisco Giants
On July 26, 2013, Moscoso was traded to the San Francisco Giants for a player to be named later or cash considerations. He was designated for assignment on November 20, 2013. On November 21, 2013 Moscoso elected to become a Free Agent.

Yokohama DeNA BayStars
On December 26, 2013, it was announced that Moscoso had signed with the Yokohama DeNA BayStars of Nippon Professional Baseball for 2014.

Bravos de León
On May 7, 2017, Moscoso signed with the Bravos de León of the Mexican Baseball League.

Los Angeles Dodgers
On February 7, 2018, Moscoso signed a minor league deal with the Los Angeles Dodgers. He appeared in 16 games (13 starts) for the AAA Oklahoma City Dodgers with a 4.90 ERA. He was released on June 29, 2018.

Second stint with León
On July 3, 2018, Moscoso signed with the Bravos de León of the Mexican League. He became a free agent following the season, but later re-signed with the team on April 23, 2019.

Pericos de Puebla
On July 2, 2019, Moscoso was traded to the Pericos de Puebla of the Mexican League.

Third stint with León
On November 29, 2019, Moscoso was traded back to the Bravos de León of the Mexican League. Moscoso was released by the Bravos on February 17, 2020.
After the 2020 season, he played for Tigres de Aragua of the Liga Venezolana de Béisbol Profesional (LVMP). He has also played for Venezuela in the 2021 Caribbean Series.

On December 20, 2021, Moscoso re-signed with the Bravos de León of the Mexican League for the 2022 season.

Pitching style
Moscoso throws three main pitches: a four-seam fastball (90–92), a curveball (77–79), and a changeup to left-handed hitters (80–81). He has experimented with a cut fastball and slider to right-handers, but he does not use them frequently.
After he went to Japan, he learned a two-seam fastball.

See also
 List of Major League Baseball players from Venezuela

References

External links

Pura Pelota (VPBL stats)

1983 births
Living people
Bravos de León players
Colorado Rockies players
Colorado Springs Sky Sox players
Erie SeaWolves players
Frisco RoughRiders players
Gulf Coast Tigers players
Iowa Cubs players
Lakeland Flying Tigers players
Leones del Caracas players
Major League Baseball pitchers
Major League Baseball players from Venezuela
Mexican League baseball pitchers
National baseball team players
Nippon Professional Baseball pitchers
Oakland Athletics players
Oklahoma City Dodgers players
Oklahoma City RedHawks players
Oneonta Tigers players
Pericos de Puebla players
Sportspeople from Maracay
Sacramento River Cats players
San Francisco Giants players
Texas Rangers players
Tigres de Aragua players
Venezuelan expatriate baseball players in Japan
Venezuelan expatriate baseball players in Mexico
Venezuelan expatriate baseball players in the United States
Venezuelan people of Colombian descent
West Michigan Whitecaps players
Yokohama DeNA BayStars players
2017 World Baseball Classic players